Route 864 is a north-south regional highway in the Galilee in northern Israel.  It begins in the south at Rameh junction with Highway 85 and ends in the north at Hosen junction with Highway 89.

Description of the route
 The route begins in the south at Rameh junction with Highway 85 near Rameh.  Near this junction is another junction from which one may continue southward on Route 804.
About 4 km into the sloped route, an access road turns east into Beit Jan.
Half a km further west, an access road turns west into Harashim.
 Route 864 continues north about 3 km to Peki'in/Boki'a.  
 About 1 km further north, Route 8655 turns west into Peki'in Hadasha, Kfar Sumi'a and Kisra.
 3 km northwest of the Route 8655 junction, Route 864 ends at Hosen junction in Hosen with Highway 89.

From just south of Peki'in until its northern terminus in Hosen, the route follows approximately the path of the Peki'in Creek, which lies to the west of the road.

See also
List of highways in Israel
Route 866 (Israel)

864